The 1976 United States presidential election in Kentucky took place on November 2, 1976, as part of the 1976 United States presidential election. Voters chose 9 representatives, or electors, to the Electoral College, who voted for president and vice president.

Kentucky was won by Jimmy Carter (D–Georgia), with 52.75 percent of the popular vote. Carter defeated incumbent President Gerald Ford (R–Michigan), who finished with 45.57 percent of the popular vote, and did so by winning all major demographic groups in the Commonwealth. No third-party candidate amounted to 1 percent of the vote; American Party candidate Thomas Anderson came the closest with 0.71 percent.

Carter went on to become the 39th president of the United States. , this is the last election in which Warren County, Hardin County, Madison County, Christian County, Taylor County, and Lincoln County voted for a Democratic presidential candidate, and the last in which Boone County did not support the Republican candidate. This is also the last presidential election in which a Democratic presidential candidate won a majority of the vote in the state.

Results

Results by county

References

1976 Kentucky elections
Kentucky
1976